Fred Woolley (22 December 1880 – 18 January 1955) was an Australian rugby league footballer who played in the 1900s and 1910s.  He played for Balmain and was a foundation player of the club.

Background
Woolley played Rugby Union with Northern Districts, Glebe and Balmain before switching codes to join Balmain in 1908.

Playing career
Woolley was a foundation player for Balmain and played in the club's first ever season which was also the first season of Rugby League in Australia.

In 1909, Woolley was selected to play for Australia, New South Wales and Metropolis.

Woolley went on to play with Balmain up until the end of 1910 and remarkably went his whole career without scoring a try.

Woolley was the uncle of Australian Rugby League Hall of Fame inductee Wally Prigg.

References

1880 births
1955 deaths
Australia national rugby league team players
Australian rugby league players
Australian rugby union players
Balmain Tigers players
New South Wales rugby league team players
Rugby league players from Sydney
Rugby union players from Sydney
Rugby league fullbacks
Rugby league wingers